The Manso River is a river in Minas Gerais state in southeastern Brazil, located southeast of Belo Horizonte, the state capital. The Manso River also runs through the countries of Argentina and Chile where whitewater rafting is a popular recreation.

See also
 List of rivers of Minas Gerais
List of rivers of Argentina
List of rivers of Chile

References
 Map from Ministry of Transport
 Rand McNally, The New International Atlas, 1993.

Rivers of Minas Gerais